Anders Knutsson Ångström (1888 – 1981) was a Swedish physicist and meteorologist who was known primarily for his contributions to the field of atmospheric radiation. However, his scientific interests encompassed many diverse topics.

He was the son of physicist Knut Ångström. He graduated with a BS from the University of Upsala in 1909. Then he completed his MS at the University of Upsala in 1911. He taught at the University of Stockholm. Later, he was the department head of the Meteorology department at State Meteorological and Hydrological Institute (SMHI) of Sweden 1945–1949 and SMHI's chancellor 1949–1954.

He is credited with the invention of the pyranometer, the first device to accurately measure direct and indirect solar radiation.

In 1962 he was awarded the International Meteorological Organization Prize by the World Meteorological Organization.

See also
Angstrom exponent
Anders Jonas Ångström (grandfather)
Knut Ångström (father)
Albedo
Insolation

References

1888 births
1981 deaths
Scientists from Stockholm
Uppsala University alumni
Academic staff of Stockholm University
Swedish meteorologists
20th-century Swedish physicists
20th-century Swedish inventors